Judith Jones (née Bailey; March 10, 1924 – August 2, 2017) was an American writer and editor, best known for having rescued The Diary of Anne Frank from the reject pile. Jones also championed Julia Child's Mastering the Art of French Cooking. She retired as senior editor and vice president at Alfred A. Knopf in 2011. Jones was also a cookbook author and memoirist. She won multiple lifetime achievement awards, including the James Beard Foundation Lifetime Achievement Award in 2006.

Career

Editor 
Jones joined Knopf in 1957 as an assistant to Blanche Knopf and editor working mainly on translations of French writers such as Albert Camus and Jean-Paul Sartre. Before that she worked for Doubleday, first in New York City and then in Paris, where she read and recommended The Diary of Anne Frank, pulling it out of the rejection pile. Jones recalled that she came across Frank's work in a slush pile of material that had been rejected by other publishers; she was struck by a photograph of the girl on the cover of an advance copy of the French edition. "I read it all day," she noted. "When my boss returned, I told him, 'We have to publish this book.' He said, 'What? That book by that kid?'" She brought the diary to the attention of Doubleday's New York office. "I made the book quite important because I was so taken with it, and I felt it would have a real market in America. It’s one of those seminal books that will never be forgotten," Jones said.

Jones's relationship with Julia Child similarly began when Jones became interested in Child's manuscript Mastering the Art of French Cooking, which had been rejected by a publishing house. After her years in Paris, Jones had moved to New York, where she was frustrated with the ingredients and recipes commonly available in the U.S. Jones said of the book Mastering the Art of French Cooking, "This was the book I had been searching for," and she got it published. In America's postwar years, home cooking was dominated by packaged and frozen food, with an emphasis on ease and speed.

After the success of Child's cookbook, Jones continued to expand the resource options for American home cooks. "I got so excited by Julia's book and what it did for making people better cooks, and the tools that you needed to make it really work in an American city or small town, and I thought, If we could do this for French food, for heavens' sake, let's start doing it for other exotic cuisines!" Jones recalled. "I used the word "exotic," and that meant the Middle East with Claudia Roden, it meant better Indian cooking with Madhur Jaffrey."

After working with Edna Lewis on The Taste of Country Cooking, Jones focused more on American regional cooking.

Major culinary authors Jones brought into print include Julia Child, Lidia Bastianich, James Beard, Marion Cunningham, Rosie Daley, Edward Giobbi, Marcella Hazan, Madhur Jaffrey, Irene Kuo, Edna Lewis, Joan Nathan, Scott Peacock, Jacques Pépin, Claudia Roden, and Nina Simonds. The 18-book Knopf Cooks American series was Jones' creation.

Jones was also the longtime editor of noted authors John Updike, Anne Tyler, John Hersey, Elizabeth Bowen, Peter Taylor, and William Maxwell. Other major authors whom Jones edited include Langston Hughes, Albert Camus, and Jean-Paul Sartre.

Author
Jones wrote three books with her husband Evan, and wrote three on her own after his death: one on cooking for one person; a memoir of her life and food; and a cookbook for food that can be shared with dogs.

Jones contributed to Vogue, Saveur, Bon Appétit, Departures, and Gourmet magazines. In 2006, she was awarded the James Beard Foundation Lifetime Achievement Award.

She was portrayed by American actress Erin Dilly in the 2009 film Julie & Julia, and Fiona Glascott in the 2022 series Julia.

“Learning to like cooking alone is an ongoing process. But the alternative is worse.”

"For a long time, the women — and they were usually women — who wrote about food were treated as second-class citizens. All because they cook! I think that's opened up. A good writer gets some good assignments, and they're treated better somehow. It just takes time."

Life and death 
Jones lived in Paris after college, where she met her husband and collaborator, Evan Jones (died 1996). The couple had four children, including two from Evans's previous marriage.

Jones died age 93 on August 2, 2017, in Walden, Vermont.

Works

 Knead It, Punch It, Bake It!: Make Your Own Bread, with Evan Jones, illustrated by Lauren Jarrett (for children, Thomas Y. Crowell Co., October 1981)
 The Book of Bread, with Evan Jones (Harper & Row, 1982)
 The L.L. Bean Game and Fish Cookbook, with Angus Cameron, illustrated by Bill Elliott (Random House, October 12, 1983)
 The L.L. Bean Book of New New England Cookery, with Evan Jones (Random House, October 12, 1987) (reprinted as The Book of New New England Cookery, illustrated by Lauren Jarrett, in paperback by UPNE, April 1, 2001) 
 The Tenth Muse: My Life in Food (Knopf, October 23, 2007)
 The Pleasures of Cooking for One (Knopf, September 29, 2009)
 Love Me, Feed Me: Sharing with Your Dog the Everyday Good Food You Cook and Enjoy (Knopf, October 28, 2014)

Awards 
 (1985) Who's Who of Food & Beverage James Beard Award 
 (2006) James Beard Foundation Lifetime Achievement Award

Cookbooks written or edited by Judith Jones that received James Beard Awards:

 (1983) The Book of Bread by Judith Jones and Evan Jones. Award: Single Subject.  
 (1993) Peppers a Story of Hot Pursuits by Amal Naj and edited by Judith Jones. Award: Writing on Food 
 (1995) Jewish Cooking in America by Joan Nathan and edited by Judith Jones. Award: Food of the Americas 
 (2000) Julia and Jacques Cooking at Home by Julia Child, Jacques Pepin and edited by Judith Jones. Award: General 
 (2000) A Spoonful of Ginger by Nina Simonds and edited by Judith Jones. Award: Healthy Focus 
 (2002) Jacques Pepin Celebrates by Jacques Pepin and edited by Judith Jones. Award: Entertaining & Special Occasions 
 (2006) The New American Cooking by Joan Nathan and edited by Judith Jones. Award: Food of the Americas 
 (2006) Spices of Life: Simple and Delicious Recipes for Great Health by Nina Simonds and edited by Judith Jones. Award: Healthy Focus

See also

 Cuisine of the United States#Modern cuisine

References

External links
 Judith Jones' Blog
 "Judith Jones reads from Tenth Muse" on NPR , January 8, 2008
 Lecture Review: "Knopf editor Judith Jones charms audience", Tuesday, April 7, 2009, by Bob Hoover, Pittsburgh Post-Gazette

1924 births
2017 deaths
American book editors
American businesspeople
American cookbook writers
American food writers
Bennington College alumni
Women cookbook writers
Women food writers
Writers from New York City
Brearley School alumni
American women non-fiction writers
21st-century American women